Guy Laroche (16 July 1921 – 17 February 1989) was a French fashion designer and founder of the eponymous company.

Biography

Laroche was born in La Rochelle, and began his career in millinery. From 1949, Laroche worked for Jean Dessès, eventually becoming his assistant. In 1955, he visited the U.S. to investigate new ready-to-wear manufacturing methods. In 1956 or 1957, he founded a high-fashion atelier at 37 Avenue Franklin Roosevelt, Paris.

His first collection was favorably received, and within it he reintroduced vibrant colors such as pink, orange, coral, topaz, and turquoise. His clothes also featured plunging neck and back lines. Traditional elegant color combinations remained a staple in his designs as well.

Known as being humble and gracious—as opposed to the aloof nature of most Parisian designers—he designed haute-couture, but practical clothing for women. For the American market, he was one of the first to create separates. As an example, a jacket to a three-piece woolen suit of black and several shades of blue is shown in the adjacent image. Along with the excellent workmanship throughout the garment, the exact matching of the pattern on the front, back, sleeves, and pockets marks the high quality, haute-couture, of the distinctive garment, although it was designed for practical use. The rest of the suit is solid black, with a skirt of the same material, and a silk blouse.

In 1961, he moved to larger quarters in a townhouse at 29 avenue Montaigne, Paris, opened a boutique there, and introduced his first ready-to-wear collection.

In 1966, Laroche introduced Fidji, his first women's fragrance, designed men's ready-to-wear, and opened the Guy Laroche Monsieur boutique. He created other fragrances, such as:

 1972 Drakkar
 1977 J'ai Osé
 1982 Drakkar Noir
 1986 Clandestine
 1993 Horizon
 1999 Drakkar Dynamik

Laroche died in Paris on 17 February 1989, at the age of 67.

Actress and film producer Hilary Swank won the Academy Award for Best Actress in 2005 wearing a Guy Laroche dress, at the time designed by Herve Leger Leroux. 

In November 2007, Franco-Swedish designer Marcel Marongiu took over as Artistic Director of Guy Laroche. Marcel Marongiu completed his third successful runway show with the AU/WI 2009 Collection.

References 

 Anne Rapin (March 1996). "Interview with Fashion Designer Michel Klein", Label France magazine, No. 23, Ministry of Foreign Affairs, France

External links 

 IMDB biography page

1921 births
1989 deaths
Fashion accessory brands
French fashion designers
French brands
High fashion brands
Luxury brands
People from La Rochelle